Mariano Stendardo (born 2 May 1983) is an Italian footballer who plays for the Serie D side Giugliano as a defender.

He has never played a match in Serie A, despite being on the roster of Lecce when they competed in Serie A in 2004.
His brother Guglielmo is also a footballer.

Career

Early career
Along with his brother Guglielmo, Mariano started his career at S.S.C. Napoli. Both Guglielmo and Mariano were transferred to separate clubs, with Mariano joining U.S. Lecce on 31 January 2004 and Guglielmo for Sampdoria in January 1999. In summer 2004 the two brothers were both transferred to Perugia.

Atalanta
However, on 28 January 2005, Mariano moved to Atalanta in a co-ownership deal, for €2,000, while Guglielmo remained at Perugia before joining Lazio in summer 2005. Atalanta acquired the full registration rights of Mariano in summer 2005 for free, after the bankruptcy of Perugia.

Loans
From Atalanta, Mariano was loaned to Bellaria and Cremonese in the 2005–06 and 2006–07 seasons.

Messina
Mariano joined Messina on 24 July 2007, for €200,000, as part of Sergio Floccari's deal.

Genoa 
After the bankruptcy of Messina in 2008, Stendardo left for Genoa C.F.C. on a free transfer.

Lega Pro clubs
On 31 January 2011 he joined Pisa from Genoa.

On 2 November 2012 he was signed by Treviso. Stendardo was signed by Serie D club Savoia. The club promoted to Lega Pro in 2014.

In 2014, he was signed by Barletta. The club was expelled from 2015–16 Lega Pro due to financial difficulties.

On 19 July 2015, he signed a 2-year deal with the Lega Pro newcomer Fidelis Andria.

On 21 January 2019, he signed a 1.5-year contract with Paganese.

On 21 August 2020 he moved to Serie D club Giugliano.

Footnotes

References

External links 
 gazzetta.it
 

1983 births
Living people
Italian footballers
Footballers from Naples
Serie B players
Serie C players
S.S.C. Napoli players
U.S. Lecce players
A.C. Perugia Calcio players
Atalanta B.C. players
U.S. Cremonese players
A.C.R. Messina players
F.C. Grosseto S.S.D. players
Association football defenders
Taranto F.C. 1927 players
A.C. Bellaria Igea Marina players
Treviso F.B.C. 1993 players
A.C. Savoia 1908 players
S.S. Fidelis Andria 1928 players
Matera Calcio players
Paganese Calcio 1926 players
S.S.C. Giugliano players